Robert, Rob, Bob or Bobby Scott may refer to:

Academics
 Robert Scott (Master of Clare) (1569–1620), Master of Clare College, Cambridge and Dean of Rochester
 Robert Scott (philologist) (1811–1887), Dean of Rochester, co-editor with Henry George Liddell of the Greek dictionary A Greek-English Lexicon
 Robert Forsyth Scott (1849–1933), mathematician, barrister and Master of St John's College, Cambridge
 Robert Scott (engineer) (1861–1930), New Zealand railway engineer and professor of engineering at Canterbury University College
 Bob Scott (ornithologist) (1938–2009), British ornithologist and conservationist
 Robert L. Scott (1928–2018), American professor of communications studies
 Robert A. Scott, president of Adelphi University
 Robert E. Scott (born 1943), Columbia law professor

Business
 Bob Scott (businessman) (born 1944), English businessman in South London
 Rob Scott (businessman) (born 1969), Australian CEO and rower
 Robert Scott (businessman, born 1822) (1822–1904), English businessman
 Robert Scott (businessman, born 1946), American businessman

Entertainment
 Robert Scott (author) (c. 1941–2015), true crime author
 Bobby Scott (musician) (1937–1990), American musician, producer and songwriter
 Robert Scott (musician), member of New Zealand bands The Bats, The Clean, and The Magick Heads
 Robert Vere Scott (1877–c. 1944), Australian photographer
 Robert Adrian Scott (1911–1972), American screenwriter and film producer

Military 
 Robert Falcon Scott (1868–1912), British Royal Navy officer and Antarctic explorer
 Robert B. Scott (1845–1908), United States Army soldier and Medal of Honor recipient
 Robert George Scott (1857–1918), English recipient of the Victoria Cross
 Robert Scott (VC) (1874–1961), British soldier, recipient of the Victoria Cross in the Boer War
 Robert Lee Scott Jr. (1908–2006), United States Air Force flying ace in World War II
 Robert R. Scott (1915–1941), American World War II Medal of Honor recipient
 Robert S. Scott (1913–1999), American Medal of Honor recipient
 Robert Ray Scott (1920–2006), United States Air Force officer

Politics

U.S.
 Robert Eden Scott (1808–1862), Virginia politician
 Robert Kingston Scott (1826–1900), governor of South Carolina
 Robert W. Scott (1929–2009), governor of North Carolina
 Robert W. Scott (1861–1929), North Carolina state representative
 Bob Scott (mayor) (born 1947), mayor of Sioux City, Iowa
 Bobby Scott (politician) (born 1947), American Democratic Member of Congress from Virginia

U.K.
 Robert Scott (lawyer) (died 1592), Scottish administrator
 Robert Scott (1705–1780) of Dunninald, Member of Parliament (MP) for Forfarshire 1733–34
 Robert Scott (MP for Huntingdonshire), Member of Parliament (MP) for Huntingdonshire
 Robert Scott (died 1808), British politician
 Robert Wellbeloved Scott (1803–1856), British Liberal Member of Parliament for Walsall
 Robert Heatlie Scott (1905–1982), British civil servant
 Donald Scott (politician) (Robert Donald Scott, 1901–1974), British Conservative Member of Parliament for Wansbeck 1940–1945

Other countries
 Robert Scott (colonial administrator) (1903–1968), colonial administrator
 Robert Scott (Manitoba politician), Canadian politician of the Christian Heritage Party
 Robert Scott (New Zealand politician) (1854–1944), New Zealand politician
 Bob Scott (Queensland politician) (1931–2011), Queensland politician
Bob Scott (New South Wales politician) (born 1943)
 Robert Scott (public servant) (1841–1922), First Secretary of the Australian Government Postmaster-General's Department

Sports

Baseball
 Bob Scott (baseball) (1892–1947), American Negro leagues baseball outfielder
 Robert Scott (first baseman) (born 1917), American Negro leagues baseball first baseman
 Robert Scott (pitcher) (1931–2020), American Negro leagues baseball pitcher

Football and rugby
 Bobby Scott (American football) (born 1949), Tennessee Volunteers and New Orleans Saints quarterback
 Bob Scott (Australian footballer) (1894–1990), Australian rules footballer for Fitzroy
 Bobby Scott (Australian footballer) (1887–1957), Australian rules footballer for Richmond
 Robert Scott (Australian footballer) (born 1969), Australian rules footballer for Geelong and North Melbourne
 Bob Scott (umpire) (1901–1956), Australian rules football umpire
 Bob Scott (footballer, born 1953), English footballer
 Rob Scott (footballer) (born 1973), English footballer and manager
 Bob Scott (rugby) (1921–2012), New Zealand All Blacks rugby union player
 Robert Scott (footballer, born 1870) (1870–?), Scottish international footballer
 Robert Scott (footballer, born 1964), Scottish footballer
 Robert Scott (footballer, born 1990), Scottish footballer
 Bert Scott (Robert Scott, 1930–2015), Scottish footballer
 Robert Scott (rugby union, born 1882) (1882–1950), Scottish rugby union player
 Robert Scott (rugby union, born 1872) (1872–1947), Scottish rugby union player

Other sports
 Robert Scott (cricketer) (1909–1957), cricketer for Oxford University and Sussex
 Robert Scott (deer stalker) (1903–1981), on Mar Lodge Estate, Aberdeenshire
 Bob Scott (racing driver) (1928–1954), from California
 Rob Scott (businessman) (born 1969), Australian rower and businessman
 Robert H. Scott (c. 1930–2016), Johns Hopkins lacrosse coach, 1955–1974
 Joseph Scott (bobsleigh) (Robert Joseph Scott, 1922–2000), American Olympic bobsledder
 Robert Scott (cyclist) (born 1998), British cyclist

Other
 Robert Scott (engraver) (1777–1841), Scottish engraver
 Robert Scott (moderator) (1897–1975), Scottish minister and religious author
 Robert Henry Scott (1833–1916), Irish meteorologist
 Robert Lowry Scott (born 1951), British Lord Lieutenant of County Tyrone
 Robert Sinclair Scott (1843–1905), Scottish ship builder
 Robert K. Scott (diplomat), American diplomat
 Robert Leonard Ewing Scott, American convicted murderer

See also
 Bert Scott (disambiguation)